Rew is a surname and place name of English origin, and may refer to:

People
 Charles Rew, British rower
 George Campbell Rew, American chemist, co-inventor of alum-based Calumet baking powder
 Harvey Rew, English professional footballer
 Henry Rew, English rugby union player
 James Rew, English cricketer
 Kate Rew, English journalist and author
 Kim Rew, South African sailor
 Kimberley Rew, English singer-songwriter and guitarist
 Quentin Rew, New Zealand race walker
 R.E.W. Turner, a Canadian army officer during the Boer War and World War I
 Robert Rew, mayor of Rockford, Illinois from 1917 to 1921
 R. Henry Rew, British agricultural statistician
 Thomas Rew, United States Air Force major general

Places
 Rew Down, a nature reserve on the Isle of Wight
 Rew, Pennsylvania
 Rew Street, a village on the Isle of Wight
 Rewe, Devon

Other
 An abbreviation for rewind
 Editorial shorthand for rewrite in a technical document
 ICAO airline code for Regional Air Express (call sign Regional Wings), in Germany
 Real Estate Weekly, an American real estate magazine
 Renewable Energy World, an industry publication of PennWell Corporation
 Rew 40 Index, an index of stock prices of publicly traded renewable energy companies
 Rew-Ardashir, a titular see in the Chaldean Catholic Church
 Ruby Eyed White, a variety of Angora rabbit

See also
 Reenu-Rew, a radical Marxist group in Senegal
Rewe (disambiguation)
Roo (disambiguation)
Ru (disambiguation)
Rue (disambiguation)